Jaghdar may refer to:
 Jaghdar-e Bala
 Jaghdar-e Pain